This is a list of people who have served as Custos Rotulorum of Caernarvonshire.

 Sir Richard Bulkeley c. 1544
 John "Wynn" ap Maredudd bef. 1550–1559
 Maurice Wynn bef. 1562 – aft. 1577
 Robert Dudley, 1st Earl of Leicester bef. 1579–1588
 William Maurice bef. 1594–1596
 Sir Thomas Mostyn 1596–1618
 Sir John Wynn, 1st Baronet 1618–1627
 Sir Richard Wynn, 2nd Baronet 1627–1646
 Interregnum
 Sir Richard Wynn, 4th Baronet 1660–1674
 Richard Bulkeley, 3rd Viscount Bulkeley 1679–1689
 Lord Edward Russell 1689–1714
 Peregrine Bertie, 2nd Duke of Ancaster and Kesteven 1714–1739
 Sir William Yonge, 4th Baronet 1739–1755
 Sir John Wynn, 2nd Baronet 1756–1773
 Thomas Wynn, 1st Baron Newborough 1773–1781
For later custodes rotulorum, see Lord Lieutenant of Caernarvonshire.

References
Institute of Historical Research - Custodes Rotulorum 1544-1646
Institute of Historical Research - Custodes Rotulorum 1660-1828

Caernarvonshire